Vršatské Podhradie is a village and municipality in Ilava District in the Trenčín Region of north-western Slovakia.

History
In historical records the village was first mentioned in 1439.

Geography
The municipality lies at an altitude of 650 metres and covers an area of 13.430 km². It has a population of about 249.

Economy and infrastructure
There is a hotel (Hotel Vrsatec) located by the Vrsatec cliffs that provides employment for the village residents.

Notable personalities
Anton Svoboda (1861–1928), pedagogue, schoolman

References

External links

  Official page
https://web.archive.org/web/20071027094149/http://www.statistics.sk/mosmis/eng/run.html 

Villages and municipalities in Ilava District